Ojos del Caburgua is a waterfall located 15 kilometers east of Pucón and four kilometers south of Caburgua Lake in the region of Aracaunía in southern Chile.

References

"Atractivos Cercanos a Pucón." TurismoChile.com. 6 Dec. 2007 <https://web.archive.org/web/20110717113121/http://www.turismochile.com/guia/pucon/articulos/846>.
Jozami, Karina. "Ojos De Caburgua." Interpatagonia.com. 6 Dec. 2007 <http://www.interpatagonia.com/paseos/ojos/>.

Landforms of Araucanía Region
Waterfalls of Chile
Springs of Chile